David Groff is an American poet, writer, and independent editor.

Biography
Groff graduated from the University of Iowa, with an MFA, and MA.  He has taught at University of Iowa, Rutgers University, and NYU, and at William Paterson University.

For the last eleven years, he has worked with literary and popular novelists, memoirists, journalists, and scientists whose books have been published by Atria, Bantam, HarperCollins, Hyperion, Little Brown, Miramax, Putnam, St. Martin's, Wiley, and other publishers. For twelve years he was an editor at Crown Publishing.

Groff's work was published in American Poetry Review, Bloom, Chicago Review, Christopher Street, Confrontation, The Georgia Review, The Iowa Review, Men on Men 2, Men on Men 2000, Missouri Review, New York, North American Review, Northwest Review, Out, Poetry, Poetry Daily, Poetry Northwest, Poz, Prairie Schooner, QW, Self, 7 Days, 7 Carmine, and Wigwag.

Groff was awarded the Louise Bogan Award by the Lambda Literary Foundation in 2012 for his work, Clay.

He is currently an editor under the agency of Rob Weisbach Creative Management.

He is openly gay.

Bibliography
 2001 National Poetry Series, for Theory of Devolution

Poetry

Non-Fiction

References

External links
 "David Groff", Consulting Editor's Alliance

Year of birth missing (living people)
Living people
American male poets
American gay writers
University of Iowa alumni
University of Iowa faculty
Rutgers University faculty
New York University faculty
William Paterson University faculty
American LGBT poets
Lambda Literary Award winners
21st-century LGBT people
Gay poets